Felix Alfonso Motagalvan (born February 11, 1987) is an American soccer player.

Playing career

Youth and college 

Motagalvan was born in Santa Rosa, California, grew up in Gilroy, California, and attended Gilroy High School where he was a two-time NSCAA/adidas All-American.  He played club soccer for Santa Clara Sporting Ruckus from 2004 to 2005, and was a two-year member of the Region IV Olympic Development Team and Super Y-League Select National Team.

He played four years of college soccer at the University of California, Santa Barbara, featuring in over 50 games during his four seasons, and playing an instrumental part of the Gaucho's run to the 2006 NCAA Division I title.

During his college years he also played for Ventura County Fusion in the USL Premier Development League, scoring the winning goal in the 2009 PDL Championship Game.

Professional 

While in College Motagalvan played with the Chivas USA reserve team during 2008 and 2009.

In 2009, he was called in to preseason with the San Jose Earthquakes of the MLS. Later that year he went on to FC Dallas of the MLS to finish the 2009 season with the reserve team.

Rochester Rhinos 
He signed with Rochester Rhinos on February 16, 2010, and made his professional debut on April 10, 2010 in Rochester's season opening game against Miami FC.  Motagalvan played in 28 of the Rhinos' 30 USSF Division 2 matches, in addition to both playoff games.

He scored his first professional goal on April 23, 2011, a 3–2 win over the Dayton Dutch Lions.  He played in 21 regular season matches in the 2011 USL Pro season, scoring twice, in addition to playing in both playoff games.

Fort Lauderdale Strikers 
On February 3, 2012 it was announced that Fort Lauderdale Strikers of the North American Soccer League had signed Motagalvan.

Pittsburgh Riverhounds 
Motagalvan joined the Riverhounds in 2013.

Sacramento Republic 
Although he had briefly considered retiring, Motagalvan joined Sacramento Republic.

Coaching career 
Motagalvan aspires to move full-time into coaching after his playing days.  While still an active player, he served as an assistant coach for Folsom Lake College's men's soccer program.

International 
Motagalvan was called up to the United States national beach soccer team in August 2014.

Honors

Rochester Rhinos 
USSF Division 2 Pro League Regular Season Champions (1): 2010

Ventura County Fusion 
USL Premier Development League Champions (1): 2009

References

External links 
 Pittsburgh Riverhounds squad sheet
 
 USSF Division 2 player profile
 
 UC Santa Barbara player profile

1987 births
Living people
Sportspeople from Santa Rosa, California
American soccer players
Soccer players from California
Association football midfielders
UC Santa Barbara Gauchos men's soccer players
Ventura County Fusion players
Rochester New York FC players
Fort Lauderdale Strikers players
Pittsburgh Riverhounds SC players
Sacramento Republic FC players
USL League Two players
USSF Division 2 Professional League players
USL Championship players
North American Soccer League players
American beach soccer players
Gilroy High School alumni